Susanne Juranek (born 25 February 1975 in Brake, Lower Saxony) is a German cyclist born in Brake a. d. Unterweser but spend her childhood and teenager age in Goslar where she began mountain biking. Later she moved to Oldenburg and due to the "flatter" landscape she started to shift to cyclo-cross and road cycling for the AGC team Bertram Roemer. She participates internationally mainly in cyclo-cross.

Honours

Cyclo-cross
2005
3rd Internationales Querfeldeinrennen

2006
2nd Hamburg A
1st Hamburg B
2nd Berlin
2nd Wouden
3rd Gieten (2006/07 Cyclo-cross Superprestige)

External links

1975 births
Living people
People from Brake, Lower Saxony
Cyclists from Lower Saxony
German female cyclists
Cyclo-cross cyclists